Ranald Og MacDonald was a son of Angus MacDonald, 8th of Dunnyveg. He captured Dunyvaig Castle in 1614 from the constable Andrew Knox and royal garrison. Dunyvaig was retaken by his brother Angus Og.

References
p378, Rev. A. MacDonald & Rev. A. MacDonald; The Clan Donald

17th-century Scottish people
People from Islay
Gaels
Year of birth unknown